The 19 Eylül Stadium is a multi-use stadium in Ordu, Turkey. It is currently used mostly for football matches and is the home ground of 52 Orduspor and Orduspor. The stadium holds 11,024 people and was built in 1967.

References

External links
 Venue information

Football venues in Turkey
Sport in Ordu
Buildings and structures in Ordu Province
Sports venues completed in 1967
Multi-purpose stadiums in Turkey